Henry Romero may refer to:

Henry Romero (Salvadoran footballer) (born 1991), Salvadoran football defender
Henry Romero (Honduran footballer) (born 1996), Honduran football forward